Polyana may refer to:

Russia
 Polyana, Amur Oblast, a selo
 Polyana, Astrakhan Oblast, a settlement
 Polyana, Republic of Bashkortostan, a settlement
 Polyana, Klintsovsky District, Bryansk Oblast, a settlement
 Polyana, Medvensky District, Kursk Oblast, a khutor
 Polyana, Vologda Oblast, a village

Ukraine
 Polyana, a village in Turyatka, Chernivtsi Oblast 
 Polyana, Khotyn Raion, Chernivtsi Oblast

See also 
 Polyana-D4
 Bolshaya Polyana, a list of Russian localities
 Krasnaya Polyana, a list of Russian localities
 Russkaya Polyana, a list of Russian localities
 Yasnaya Polyana (disambiguation)
 

ru:Поляна (значения)#Населённые пункты
uk:Поляна#Україна